The Football League play-offs for the 2003–04 season were held in May 2004, with the finals taking place at Millennium Stadium in Cardiff. The play-off semi-finals will be played over two legs and will be contested by the teams who finish in 3rd, 4th, 5th and 6th place in the Football League First Division and Football League Second Division and the 4th, 5th, 6th and 7th placed teams in the Football League Third Division table. The winners of the semi-finals will go through to the finals, with the winner of the matches gaining promotion for the following season.

Background
The Football League play-offs have been held every year since 1987. They take place for each division following the conclusion of the regular season and are contested by the four clubs finishing below the automatic promotion places.

In the First Division, Sunderland, who are aiming to return to the top flight after relegation last season, finished 7 points behind second placed West Bromwich Albion, who in turn finished 8 points behind champions Norwich City, who returned to the Premier League for the first time since 1995. West Ham United who are also along with Sunderland aiming to return to the top flight after relegation last season, finished in fourth place in the table. Ipswich Town who are looking for a place back in the top flight at the second attempt, finished in fifth place. Crystal Palace finished level on points with Ipswich Town and were looking for a place back in the Premiership for the first time since 1998.

First Division

Semi-finals
First leg

Second leg

Sunderland 4–4 Crystal Palace on aggregate. Crystal Palace won 5–4 on penalties.

West Ham United won 2–1 on aggregate.

Final

Second Division

Semi-finals
First leg

Second leg

Bristol City won 3–2 on aggregate.

Brighton & Hove Albion 2–2 Swindon Town on aggregate. Brighton & Hove Albion won 4–3 on penalties.

Final

Third Division

Semi-finals
First leg

Second leg

Huddersfield Town won 4–3 on aggregate.

Mansfield Town 3–3 Northampton Town on aggregate. Mansfield Town won 5–4 on penalties.

Final

External links
Football League website

 
English Football League play-offs
Play
May 2004 sports events in the United Kingdom